An Offer You Can’t Refuse is a novel by British author Jill Mansell.
An Offer You Can't Refuse, was in The Sunday Times paperback charts for five weeks in 2008. "In 2008, sales of Jill's novels in their Headline editions around the world are now at over 4m copies.

Background
Jill Mansell first had the idea for becoming a novelist after reading an article in a magazine about women who had changed their lives by becoming best-selling authors. Eventually she decided to write the kind of book "I would love to read". The end result was her first novel, Fast Friends.

Characters in An Offer You Can't Refuse
 Lola Malone
 Dougie Tennant

Release details 
 2008, UK, Headline Review, pub date 7 February 2008, hardback 
 2008, UK, Headline Review, pub date 26 June 2008, paperback
 2008, UK, Headline Review, pub date 10 February 2008, E-book

References

2008 British novels
Romantic comedy novels
British romance novels
Contemporary romance novels
Headline Publishing Group books